{{DISPLAYTITLE:C5H11NO}} 
The molecular formula C5H11NO (molar mass: 101.15 g/mol) may refer to: 

 N-Hydroxypiperidine
 Isovaleramide 
 N-Methylmorpholine
 Pivalamide
 Prolinol